Events in the year 1634 in Norway.

Incumbents
Monarch: Christian IV

Events

Arts and literature
Termini Juridici, the first Norwegian dictionary by Chancellor Jens Bjelke, is first published.

Births

16 January – Dorothe Engelbretsdotter, hymn and poem writer (died 1716).
Bjørn Frøysåk, farmer and merchant (died 1709).

Deaths

References

See also